Matiu is the stage name of Matthew Vachon (born 1987), an Innu singer-songwriter from Uashat-Maliotenam, Quebec. He is most noted as a three-time Felix Award nominee for Indigenous Artist of the Year, receiving nods at the 41st Félix Awards in 2019, the 42nd Félix Awards in 2020, and the 43rd Félix Awards in 2021.

Vachon competed in Le Rythme, APTN's music competition for First Nations musicians, in 2016, He released a self-titled EP in 2017, and released his full-length debut album Petikat in 2018.

He has been a member of Florent Vollant's Nikamu Mamuitun collective, alongside Marcie Michaud-Gagnon, Joëlle St-Pierre, Chloé Lacasse, Scott-Pien Picard, Kanen, Cédrik St-Onge and Ivan Boivin,

References

1987 births
21st-century Canadian singers
21st-century First Nations people
First Nations musicians
Canadian male singer-songwriters
Canadian folk singer-songwriters
French-language singers of Canada
Singers from Quebec
Innu people
Living people